Halorellidae is an extinct family of brachiopods belonging to the order Rhynchonellida.

Fossil record
These lamp shells lived in the Triassic (age range: 221.5 to 201.6 Ma). Fossils of this family can be found in Austria, Canada, China, Hungary, Indonesia, New Zealand, Russia, Slovakia, Tajikistan, Turkey and United States.

References 

Brachiopods